Albert Lancaster Lloyd (29 February 1908 – 29 September 1982), usually known as A. L. Lloyd or Bert Lloyd, was an English folk singer and collector of folk songs, and as such was a key figure in the British folk revival of the 1950s and 1960s. While Lloyd is most widely known for his work with British folk music, he had a keen interest in the music of Spain, Latin America, Southeastern Europe and Australia. He recorded at least six discs of Australian Bush ballads and folk music.

Lloyd also helped establish the folk music subgenre of industrial folk music through his books, recordings, collecting and theoretical writings.

Early life
Lloyd was born in the Wandsworth district of London.  His father was an AA Patrolman and failed smallholder. His mother sang songs around the house and according to Lloyd mimicked the gypsy singers that she had heard. By the age of fifteen his mother had died and his father, an ex-soldier, was a semi-invalid, and Lloyd was sent as an assisted migrant to Australia in a scheme organised by the British Legion. There, from 1924 to 1930, he worked on various sheep stations in New South Wales and it was during this time that he began to write down folksongs he learned. In the outback of New South Wales he discovered that he could access the State Library and order books. His special interests being art and music he could get a grasp of those topics without seeing a painting or hearing any music. He also bought a wind-up gramophone and began to investigate some of the classical music he had previously read about.

Career as folklorist
When Lloyd returned to the UK in 1935, during the Great Depression, in the absence of a permanent job he pursued his interests in studying folk music and social and economic history, doing much of his research at the British Museum; he is quoted as saying that there is "nothing like unemployment for educating oneself". In 1937, he signed on board a factory whaling ship, the Southern Empress, bound for the southern whaling grounds of the Antarctic.

During this decade, Lloyd joined the Communist Party of Great Britain and was strongly influenced by the writings of the Marxist historian, A. L. Morton, particularly his 1938 book A People's History of England. In 1937, Lloyd's article "The People's own Poetry" was published in the Daily Worker (since 1966 renamed Morning Star) newspaper.

In 1938, the BBC hired Lloyd to write a radio documentary about seafaring life, and from then on he worked as a journalist and singer. As a proponent of communism, he was staunchly opposed to Adolf Hitler, and, in 1939, was commissioned by the BBC to produce a series of programmes on the rise of Nazism. Between 1945 and 1950 he was employed as a journalist by Picture Post magazine but he left the job in an act of solidarity with one of his colleagues.

By the 1950s, Lloyd had established himself as a professional folklorist—as Colin Harper puts it "in a field of one". Harper went to note that, at a time when the English folk revival was dominated by young people who wore jeans and pullovers, Lloyd was rarely seen in anything other than a suit (and a wide grin). Ewan MacColl is quoted as describing Lloyd affectionately as "a walking toby jug". In 1959, Lloyd's collaboration with Ralph Vaughan Williams, The Penguin Book of English Folk Songs, was published.

The 1956 film Moby Dick, directed by John Huston, featured Lloyd singing a sea shanty as the Pequod first sets sail. There is also a brief visual clip of him.

In the early 1960s, Lloyd became associated with an enterprise known as "Centre 42" which arose from Resolution 42 of the 1960 Trades Union Congress, concerning the importance of arts in the community. Centre 42 was a touring festival aimed at devolving art and culture from London to the other main working class towns of Britain. It was led by Arnold Wesker, with MacColl and Lloyd providing the musical content and Charles Parker on production. Centre 42 was important in bringing a range of folk performers to the public attention: Anne Briggs, the Ian Campbell Folk Group, The Spinners and The Watersons.

Lloyd recorded many albums of English folk music, most notably several albums of the Child Ballads with MacColl. He also published many books on folk music and related topics, including The Singing Englishman, Come All Ye Bold Miners, and Folk Song in England. He was a founder-member of Topic Records and remained as their artistic director until his death.

The accompanying book to the Topic Records 70 year anniversary boxed set Three Score and Ten includes a short biography and lists two albums he is closely associated with as classic albums, The Iron Muse and Frost and Fire by The Watersons. Track five on the second CD has Lloyd singing The Two Magicians from another album he was closely associated with, being The Bird in the Bush (Traditional Erotic Songs).

Mark Gregory interviewed him in 1970 for the National Library of Australia, and Michael Grosvenor Myer for Folk Review magazine in September 1974.

Lloyd died at his home in Greenwich in 1982.

Discography

Solo albums
The Shooting of His Dear / Lord Bateman, HMV B.10593, 78rpm, 1953
Down in Yon Forest / The Bitter Withy, HMV B.10594, 78rpm, 1953
Bold Jack Donahue / Banks of the Condamine, Topic TRC84, 78rpm, 1954
Australian Bush Songs, Riverside RLP 12-606, 1956
The Foggy Dew and Other Traditional English Love Songs, Tradition Records TLP 1016, LP, US, 1956
Banks of the Condamine and Other Bush Songs, Wattle Records (Australia) 10-inch LP, 1957
Across the Western Plains, Wattle Records (Australia) LP, 1958
Outback Ballads. Folk songs of Australia. Topic Records 12T51, 1958
English Drinking Songs, Riverside Records (US) LP, 1961. CD Reissue: Topic records
England and Her Folk Songs (A Selection From The Penguin Book), with Alf Edwards, Collector Records (UK) 7-inch EP
First Person (Some of His Favourite Folk Songs), Topic Records LP, 1966
The Best of A. L. Lloyd, Xtra (UK) LP, 1966
Leviathan, Topic Records (UK) LP, 1967. CD Reissue: Topic records
Ten Thousand Miles Away: English and Australian Folk Songs, Fellside Records (UK) 2CD, 2008
An Evening with A. L. Lloyd  Fellside Recordings (UK) CD, 2010
Turtle Dove, Fellside Records (UK), 2014

With Ewan MacColl
The English and Scottish Popular Ballads 9 Volumes, Washington albums, 1952
Blow Boys Blow (Songs of The Sea), Tradition Records (US) LP, 1957. LP Reissue: Transatlantic, 1967. CD Reissue: Tradition, 1996
Thar She Blows! (Whaling Ballads and Songs), Riverside RLP 12-635 (US) LP, 1957
Convicts and Currency Lads. Wattle Recordings B2, EP, 1958
Whaling Ballads, Washington WLP 724 (US) LP, 196x. This was a reissue of the Riverside album above.
English and Scottish Folk Ballads, Topic Records (UK) LP, 1964
Bold Sportsmen All, Topic Records (UK) 10-inch, 1958.  CD reissue: Topic Records
Gamblers and Sporting Blades (Songs of the Ring and the Racecourse), Topic records (UK) 7-inch EP, 1962
A Sailor's Garland, Xtra Records (UK) LP, 1966

Compilations and contributions
Blow The Man Down, Topic Records (UK) 7-inch EP, 1956
The Iron Muse (A Panorama of Industrial Folk Music), Topic Records (UK) LP, 1963
Farewell Nancy (Sea Songs and Shanties), Topic Records (UK) LP, 1964
The Bird in the Bush - by A L Lloyd, Anne Briggs, Frankie Armstrong, Topic Records (UK) LP, 1966
Singing The Fishing – A Radio Ballad, Argo Records (UK) LP, 1967
"Babbacombe" Lee by Fairport Convention (1971), Island Records: Narration and arrangement
The Valiant Sailor (Songs & Ballads of Nelson's Navy), Topic Records (UK) LP, 1973
Sea Shanties, Topic Records (UK) LP, 1974
The Transports  (A Ballad Opera by Peter Bellamy), Free Reed (UK) 2LP, 1977
Topic Sampler No. 1 – Folk Songs, Topic Records (UK) LP
Topic Sampler No. 2 – Folk Songs, Topic Records (UK) LP
Topic Sampler No. 3 – Men at Work, Topic Records (UK) LP
Topic Sampler No. 6 – A Collection of Ballads & Broadsides, Topic Records (UK) LP
Topic Sampler No. 7 – Sea Songs & Shanties, Topic Records (UK) LP
 "Doodle let me go (yaller girls)" Performed on soundtrack of The Lighthouse (2019)

Recorded and edited by Lloyd
Folk Music of Bulgaria, Topic Records (UK) LP, 1964
Folk Music of Albania, Topic Records (12T154) (UK) LP, 1966

Bibliography
García Lorca, Federico (1937) Lament for the Death of a Bullfighter and other poems; translated by A. L. Lloyd. London: Heinemann
Kafka, Franz (1937) The Metamorphosis; translated by A. L. Lloyd. London: Parton Press; published as Metamorphosis (1946) by Vanguard Press, Inc.
Fallada, Hans (1952) The Drinker; translated by C. Lloyd and A. L. Lloyd: Melville House, Hoboken, N.J.
Lloyd, A. L. & Vinogradoff, Igor (1940) Shadow of the Swastika, London: John Lane The Bodley Head
Lloyd, A. L. (1944) The Singing Englishman: an introduction to folksong. London: Workers' Music Association
Lloyd, A. L. (compiler) (1945)  Corn on the Cob (Popular and Traditional Poetry of the USA) London: Fore Publications
Lloyd, A. L. (1951) Singing Englishmen: a collection of folk-songs specially prepared for a Festival of Britain concert given in association with the Arts Council of Great Britain
Lloyd, A. L. (compiler) (1952) Coaldust Ballads (Part-songs by various composers). London: Workers' Music Association
Lloyd, A. L. (compiler) (1952) Come All Ye Bold Miners (Ballads & Songs of the Coalfield) London: Lawrence & Wishart

Lloyd, A. L. (1960) The Golden City London: Methuen
Lloyd, A. L. (1967) Folk Song in England London: Lawrence & Wishart (Paperback edition: Paladin, 1975)

Films
Ken Taylor, Ten Thousand Miles: A. L. Lloyd in Australia, 1970
Gavin Barry, Bert a personal memoir, 1985

References

Further reading
Dave Arthur, Bert: the Life and Times of A. L. Lloyd. London: Pluto Press, 2012, .

External links
Biography of A. L. Lloyd in Canadian Journal for Traditional Music (1999/2000): "Starting Over: A. L. Lloyd and the Search for a New Folk Music, 1945–49" by E. David Gregory
The A. L. Lloyd Collection – Lloyd's library and papers at the Library of Goldsmiths College, University of London
Reinhard Zierke's British Folk website Most complete Discography
Bert Lloyd Centenary links – Australian Folk Songs website
A Tribute to Bert – EFDSS Concert 15 November 2008
BBC Radio 3 highlights of Tribute to Bert – Lucy Duran World Routes
EFDSS Book Launch – Bert: The Life and Times of A. L. Lloyd

1908 births
1982 deaths
Communist Party of Great Britain members
English folk musicians
English folk singers
English folk-song collectors
Tradition Records artists
English male singers
English communists
20th-century English singers
20th-century British musicologists
20th-century British male singers
Topic Records artists
Riverside Records artists